This is a list of parks and gardens in the Brussels-Capital Region divided by municipality.

A park or garden located on the territory of several municipalities is listed for each municipality.

Anderlecht

Audergem/Oudergem

Berchem-Sainte-Agathe/Sint-Agatha-Berchem

City of Brussels

Pentagon

Eastern districts

Northern districts

Southern districts

Etterbeek

Evere

Forest/Vorst

Ganshoren

Ixelles/Elsene

Jette

Koekelberg

Molenbeek-Saint-Jean/Sint-Jans-Molenbeek

Saint Gilles/Saint-Gillis

Saint-Josse-ten-Node/Sint-Joost-ten-Node

Schaerbeek/Schaarbeek

Uccle/Ukkel

Watermael-Boitsfort/Watermaal-Bosvoorde

Woluwe-Saint-Lambert/Sint-Lambrechts-Woluwe

Woluwe-Saint-Pierre/Sint-Pieters-Woluwe

References

Notes

Parks in Brussels
Brussels
Brussels-related lists
Urban public parks
Tourist attractions in Brussels